Saccharomyces boulardii is a tropical yeast first isolated from lychee and mangosteen fruit peel in 1923 by French scientist Henri Boulard. Although early reports claimed distinct taxonomic, metabolic, and genetic properties, S. boulardii is genetically a grouping of S. cerevisiae strains, sharing >99% genomic relatedness, giving the synonym S. cerevisiae var. boulardii.

S. boulardii is sometimes used as a probiotic with the purpose of introducing beneficial microbes into the large and small intestines and conferring protection against pathogens. It grows at 37 °C (98.6 °F). In addition, the popular genome-editing tool CRISPR-Cas9 was proven to be effective in S. boulardii. Boulard first isolated this yeast after he observed natives of Southeast Asia chewing on the skin of lychee and mangosteen in an attempt to control the symptoms of cholera. In healthy patients, S. boulardii has been shown to be nonpathogenic and nonsystemic (it remains in the gastrointestinal tract rather than spreading elsewhere in the body).

Biology 
S. boulardii was characterized as a species separate from S. cerevisiae because it does not digest galactose and does not undergo sporulation. It also tolerates human body temperature, gastric acid, and digestive enzymes better. Despite all these phenotypic differences, its genomic sequence defines it as a clade under S. cerevisiae, closest to those found in wine. Like ordinary S. cerevisiae, it has 16 chromosomes, a 2-micron circle plasmid, and is diploid with genes for both mating types, MATa and MATα. However, the MATa locus contains some likely disabling mutations relative to spore-forming S. cerevisiae.

Both S. boulardii and ordinary S. cerevisiae produce proteins that inhibit pathogenic bacteria and their toxins, specifically 63-kDa phosphatase pho8 (inhibiting E. coli endotoxin) and 54-kDa serine protease ysp3 (hydrolyzing C. difficile toxins A and B). A yet-unidentified 120 kDa protein also inhibits changes in cAMP levels induced by cholera toxin. S. boulardii encodes extra copies of yeast adhesion proteins called flocculins that help to stick to pathogenic bacteria and stop them from binding to the intestinal mucus.

Medical uses

The best-characterized "type" CBS 5926 strain is also deposited as ATCC 74012 and CNCM I-745. A CNCM I-1049 strain is also used; it is unclear whether it is the same as CBS 5926.

Antibiotic-associated diarrhea 
Evidence exists for its use in the preventive treatment of antibiotic-associated diarrhea (AAD) in adults. Further evidence indicates its use to prevent AAD in children.
The potential efficacy of probiotic AAD prevention is dependent on the probiotic strain(s) used and on the dosage. A 2015 meta-analysis of 21 randomised controlled trials (4780 participants) confirmed that S. boulardii is effective in reducing the risk of AAD in children and adults. Lactobacillus rhamnosus or Saccharomyces boulardii at high doses (more than 5 billion colony-forming units/day) is moderately effective (with no serious side effects) for the prevention of AAD in children and might also reduce the duration of diarrhea.

Clostridium difficile infection 
S. boulardii showed reduction of relapses in some specific patients with recurrent Clostridium difficile infection and may be effective for secondary prevention of C. difficile infection.

HIV/AIDS-associated diarrhea 
S. boulardii has been shown to significantly increase the recovery rate of stage IV AIDS patients with diarrhea versus placebo. On average, patients receiving S. boulardii gained weight, while the placebo group lost weight over the 18-month trial.  No adverse reactions were observed in these immunocompromised patients.

Elimination of Helicobacter pylori infection 

The addition of S. boulardii to the standard triple medication protocol for elimination of Helicobacter pylori infection showed a significant increase in eradication rates in a meta-analysis, though eradication rates were still not exceptional. The supplement also significantly decreased usual side effects of H. pylori eradication therapy including diarrhea and nausea.

Blastocystosis 
Also, some evidence shows potential benefits of S. boulardii in treatment of blastocystosis.

Acute gastroenteritis 
A position paper published by ESPGHAN Working Group for Probiotics and Prebiotics based on a systematic reviews and randomized controlled trials  suggested that S. boulardii (low quality of evidence, strong recommendation) may be considered in the management of children with acute gastroenteritis in addition to rehydration therapy.

Other uses

Veterinary use

Food and drinks 
S. c. var. boulardii is usable in beer brewing, with live yeast remaining in the finished product. It can coexist alongside other S. cerevisiae in mixed starter cultures.

It can be also used for baking, where its ability to deter bacteria translates into inhibition of rope spoilage, a bread defect caused by Bacillus subtilis or B. licheniformis contamination.

Research
S. boulardii has been shown to reduce body weight in an animal model of type 2 diabetes.

Safety
In immunocompromised individuals, S. boulardii has been associated with fungemia or localized infection, which may be fatal. Overall, S. boulardii is safe for use in otherwise healthy populations and fungemia with S. boulardii has not been reported, to the best of the recent evidences in immunocompetent patients. A review of HIV-1-infected patients given therapy with S. boulardii indicated it was safe. A retrospective study on 32,000 oncohematological hospitalized patients showed no occurrence of fungal sepsis with S. boulardii use.

References

External links 
 

boulardii
Yeasts
Probiotics